Hendes store aften is a 1954 Danish romance film directed by Annelise Reenberg and starring Helle Virkner.

Cast
 Helle Virkner - Marianne Friis
 Poul Reichhardt - John Bagger
 Johannes Meyer - Vicevært Julius Jensen
 Karin Nellemose - Ejer af Chez Madame
 Angelo Bruun - Hr. Poul
 Bodil Steen - Frk. Lilly
 Olaf Ussing - Sagfører Simonsen
 Lili Heglund - Kunde
 Poul Müller - Overtjener på Nimb
 Ib Schønberg - Himself
 Wandy Tworek - Himself
 Gaby Stenberg - Yvonne
 Betty Lange - Fru Simonsen
 Edith Hermansen

External links

1954 films
1950s romance films
1950s Danish-language films
Danish black-and-white films
Films directed by Annelise Reenberg
Films scored by Sven Gyldmark
Danish romance films